Radner Zinyatovich Muratov (21 October 1928 – 10 December 2004) was a Soviet and Russian stage and film actor of Tatar ethnicity. He appeared in more than twenty films from 1952 to 1987.

Filmography

References

External links
 
 

1928 births
2004 deaths
20th-century Russian male actors
Male actors from Saint Petersburg
Gerasimov Institute of Cinematography alumni
Honored Artists of the RSFSR
Tatar people of the Soviet Union
Russian male film actors
Russian male voice actors
Soviet male film actors
Soviet male voice actors
Russian male stage actors
Soviet male stage actors